Musaed Ibrahim Al-Swilem  is a Saudi football midfielder who played for Saudi Arabia.

Record at FIFA Tournaments

External links

1965 births
Living people
Saudi Arabian footballers
Saudi Arabia international footballers
1984 AFC Asian Cup players
AFC Asian Cup-winning players
Association football forwards
Saudi Professional League players
Al-Shabab FC (Riyadh) players